The women's singles competition at the 2017 FIL European Luge Championships was held on 6 January 2017.

Competition schedule
All times are local (UTC+1).

Results
Two runs in one day, were used to determine the winner.

References

Men